Zimirina is a genus of long-spinneret ground spiders that was first described by R. de Dalmas in 1919. It was transferred to the ground spiders in 2018, but was returned to Prodidominae in 2022.

Species
 it contains fifteen species, found in Africa, Portugal, Italy, Spain, and on Saint Helena:
Zimirina brevipes Pérez & Blasco, 1986 – Spain, Italy (Sardinia)
Zimirina cineris Cooke, 1964 – Canary Is.
Zimirina deserticola Dalmas, 1919 – Algeria
Zimirina gomerae (Schmidt, 1981) – Canary Is.
Zimirina grancanariensis Wunderlich, 1992 – Canary Is.
Zimirina hirsuta Cooke, 1964 – Canary Is.
Zimirina lepida (Blackwall, 1859) – Madeira
Zimirina moyaensis Wunderlich, 1992 – Canary Is.
Zimirina nabavii Wunderlich, 2011 – Canary Is.
Zimirina penicillata (Simon, 1893) (type) – Algeria
Zimirina relegata Cooke, 1977 – St. Helena
Zimirina spinicymbia Wunderlich, 1992 – Canary Is.
Zimirina tenuidens Denis, 1956 – Morocco
Zimirina transvaalica Dalmas, 1919 – South Africa
Zimirina vastitatis Cooke, 1964 – Libya, Egypt

See also
 List of Prodidominae species

References

Spiders of Europe
Araneomorphae genera
Prodidominae
Spiders of Africa